Barylestis is a genus of huntsman spiders that was first described by Eugène Louis Simon in 1910.

Species
 it contains ten species, all found in Africa, except B. saaristoi, from Thailand and Myanmar:
Barylestis blaisei (Simon, 1903) (type) – Gabon
Barylestis fagei (Lessert, 1929) – Congo, Rwanda
Barylestis insularis Simon, 1910 – Equatorial Guinea (Bioko)
Barylestis manni (Strand, 1906) – Nigeria - Nomen dubium
Barylestis montandoni (Lessert, 1929) – Congo, Uganda
Barylestis nigripectus Simon, 1910 – Congo
Barylestis occidentalis (Simon, 1887) – Congo, Uganda, Sudan
Barylestis peltatus (Strand, 1916) – Central Africa
Barylestis saaristoi Jäger, 2008 – China, Thailand, Myanmar
Barylestis scutatus (Pocock, 1903) – Cameroon
Barylestis variatus (Pocock, 1900) – West Africa. Introduced to Northern Ireland, Britain, Belgium, Netherlands, Germany, Czech Rep.

See also
 List of Sparassidae species

References

Araneomorphae genera
Sparassidae
Spiders of Africa
Spiders of Asia